"(Fuck A) Silver Lining" is a song by American pop rock band Panic! at the Disco from their sixth studio album, Pray for the Wicked (2018). It was released as a promotional single for the album on March 21, 2018, along with the lead single from the album, "Say Amen (Saturday Night)".

Charts

Weekly charts

Year-end charts

References

2018 singles
Panic! at the Disco songs
Songs written by Jake Sinclair (musician)
Songs written by Morgan Kibby
Songs written by Brendon Urie